Remodeling is the process of improving a building.

Remodeling may also refer to:

 Actin remodeling, a biochemical process in cells
 Bone remodeling, the process whereby old bone is removed from the skeleton and new bone is added
 Chromatin remodeling, the enzyme-assisted movement of nucleosomes on DNA
 Microvasculature remodeling, the alterations in a blood vessel network resulting from arteriogenesis and angiogenesis
 Ventricular remodeling, the changes in size, shape, and function of the heart after injury to the ventricles

See also

 Model (disambiguation)